The Northern Mariana Islands national under-20 football team is the under-20 football (soccer) team of the Northern Mariana Islands and is controlled by the Northern Mariana Islands Football Association.

Results and fixtures

2022

2023 AFC U-20 Asian Cup qualification

Competitive record

AFC U-20 Asian Cup

U20
Asian national under-20 association football teams